Lebanon is a city in Smith County, Kansas, United States.  As of the 2020 census, the population of the city was 178.

History
Lebanon was founded in 1876 at a site about  distant from its present site. It was moved to the new site in about 1887–1888. Lebanon is named after Lebanon, Kentucky.

The geographic center of all 50 of the US states is located near Belle Fourche, South Dakota.

Geography
Lebanon is located at  (39.810492, -98.556061). On February 13, 1905, the temperature fell to -40 °F (-40 °C), the lowest minimum temperature ever recorded in Kansas.

Area attractions
 Geographic center of the contiguous United States
 Kansas Historical Marker – The Geographic Center

Demographics

2010 census
As of the census of 2010, there were 218 people, 118 households, and 60 families residing in the city. The racial makeup of the city was 95.9% White, 0.5% Native American, 0.5% Asian, and 3.2% from two or more races. Hispanic or Latino of any race were 3.2% of the population.

There were 118 households, of which 16.9% had children under the age of 18 living with them, 42.4% were married couples living together, 4.2% had a female householder with no husband present, 4.2% had a male householder with no wife present, and 49.2% were non-families. 46.6% of all households were made up of individuals, and 22.9% had someone living alone who was 65 years of age or older. The average household size was 1.85 and the average family size was 2.62.

The median age in the city was 51.3 years. 17.4% of residents were under 18; 2.8% were between the ages of 18 and 24; 14.8% were from 25 to 44; 40.8% were from 45 to 64; and 24.3% were 65 years of age or older. The gender makeup of the city was 48.2% male and 51.8% female.

2000 census
As of the census of 2000, there were 303 people, 151 households, and 91 families residing in the city. The racial makeup of the city was 99.01% White, 0.33% Native American, and 0.66% from two or more races. Hispanic or Latino of any race were 1.32% of the population.

There were 151 households, out of which 15.9% had children under the age of 18 living with them, 54.3% were married couples living together, 3.3% had a female householder with no husband present, and 39.1% were non-families. 35.8% of all households were made up of individuals, and 19.2% had someone living alone who was 65 years of age or older. The average household size was 2.01 and the average family size was 2.57.

In the city, the population was spread out, with 15.8% under 18, 6.3% from 18 to 24, 21.5% from 25 to 44, 22.8% from 45 to 64, and 33.7% who were 65 years of age or older. The median age was 52 years. For every 100 females, there were 98.0 males. For every 100 females age 18 and over, there were 102.4 males.

The median income for a household in the city was $23,056, and the median income for a family was $28,846. Males had a median income of $22,750 versus $13,250 for females. The per capita income was $12,245. About 13.2% of families and 22.1% of the population were below the poverty line, including 33.3% of those under the age of eighteen and 5.5% of those 65 or over.

Rural flight

On October 2, 2006, Lebanon was the focus of a study of rural flight, as local farmer Randall Warner was featured in a New York Times story about the problems faced by communities such as Lebanon.

Government
The Lebanon government consists of a mayor and five council members. The council meets the second Tuesday of each month at 7 p.m., at City Hall, 404 Main St.

Education
The community is served by Smith Center USD 237 public school district.

Lebanon schools were closed through school unification. The Lebanon Bronchos (or Broncos) won the Kansas State High School boys 1A basketball championship in 1977.

In popular culture

Film
Lebanon's status as the geographic center of the contiguous United States was a plot point in the 1969 film The Computer Wore Tennis Shoes as the final question in a television quiz show.

The documentary The Return of the Buffalo: Restoring the Great American Prairie details the story and history of Lebanon amongst other great plains villages.

Television
Lebanon is featured in the American television series Supernatural as the location of the former base of a secret society known as the Men of Letters. From season 8 onwards, it has become the home base for the main characters, Sam and Dean Winchester.

In the TV series Salvation a Russian nuclear warhead explodes near Lebanon.
 
Lebanon was featured in TV series American Gods, as a point for the Old Gods and the New Gods to parlay.

In TV series House of Cards, during the sixth season's seventh episode, President Claire Underwood gives a speech in Lebanon.

During Super Bowl LV, Jeep aired an ad featuring Bruce Springsteen lighting a candle at a chapel in Lebanon.

Books
The geographic center of the contiguous United States north of Lebanon plays a reasonably important role in the book American Gods by Neil Gaiman as one of many "places of power".

References

Further reading

External links

 Lebanon - Directory of Public Officials
 USD 237, local school district
 Geographical Center of the Continental United States
 An explanation of how the Geographical Center was identified
 Lebanon city map, KDOT

Cities in Kansas
Cities in Smith County, Kansas
Populated places established in 1876
1876 establishments in Kansas